Romana Tedjakusuma (born 24 July 1976) is a former professional tennis player from Indonesia.

She made her debut in professional competition in January 1990, aged 13, at an ITF tournament in Jakarta.

In 1993 and 1994, she played in a number of Grand Slam Junior Championships. Partnered by Park Sung-hee, she reached the semifinals of the 1993 Wimbledon Junior Championships. During 1994, she also competed in three professional Grand Slam tournaments. Her best result at that level was her third round appearance in the Australian Open.

She was part of Indonesia's team at the 1996 Summer Olympics in Atlanta. She and partner Yayuk Basuki reached the second round of the women's doubles event, where they were defeated by Jana Novotná and Helena Suková.

Tedjakusuma has had two hiatuses during her professional career: from 1997 to 1998, and from 2002 to 2004. Since her return in 2005, she has won 14 further doubles titles and one singles title on the ITF Circuit. In April 2009, she was Indonesia's highest ranked doubles player.

She was part of Indonesia's Fed Cup team in 1993, 1994, 1995, 1996, 2001, 2005 and 2006.

At the 2005 Southeast Asian Games, Tedjakusuma won the gold medal in the women's doubles competition, partnered by Wynne Prakusya, and the silver medal in the women's singles. At the 2007 SEA Games, she won the silver medal in the women's doubles, partnered by Sandy Gumulya, as well as the bronze medal in singles.

Tedjakusuma was inactive on the ITF Circuit in 2010, but returned to play in several tournaments in 2011, winning one doubles title partnered by South African Surina de Beer. Tedjakusuma retired from professional tennis 2013.

WTA career finals

Doubles: 1 (1 title)

ITF finals

Singles: 14 (6–8)

Doubles: 30 (19–11)

External links
 
  
 

Indonesian female tennis players
1976 births
Living people
Sportspeople from Jakarta
Olympic tennis players of Indonesia
Tennis players at the 1996 Summer Olympics
Asian Games medalists in tennis
Tennis players at the 2006 Asian Games
Tennis players at the 1994 Asian Games
Medalists at the 1994 Asian Games
Asian Games silver medalists for Indonesia
Southeast Asian Games gold medalists for Indonesia
Southeast Asian Games silver medalists for Indonesia
Southeast Asian Games bronze medalists for Indonesia
Southeast Asian Games medalists in tennis
Competitors at the 1993 Southeast Asian Games
Competitors at the 1995 Southeast Asian Games
Competitors at the 1999 Southeast Asian Games
Competitors at the 2001 Southeast Asian Games
Competitors at the 2005 Southeast Asian Games
Competitors at the 2007 Southeast Asian Games
Sportspeople from Surabaya